Joshua Dean Windass (born 9 January 1994) is an English professional footballer who plays as an attacking midfielder for Sheffield Wednesday. He can also play as a forward.

Career

Early career
Windass played youth football for Huddersfield Town, spending ten years with the club. He was released in April 2012 and trialled with Bradford City that same month. Windass began his senior career with non-league team Harrogate Railway Athletic in December 2012. He played on a semi-professional basis, combining his football career with a job as a construction labourer.

Accrington Stanley
He signed a professional contract with Accrington Stanley in July 2013. He made his professional debut on 9 November 2013, in the FA Cup. In November 2015 he turned down a new contract from the club on the advice of his father. In January 2016 Accrington announced that Scottish club Rangers had approached Windass and teammate Matt Crooks directly, due to them being in the final six months of their contracts. The duo agreed pre-contracts with Rangers later that month, ahead of the 2016–17 season.

Rangers
Windass joined Rangers on 1 July 2016, signing a four-year contract alongside fellow Accrington player Matt Crooks. Both players had already been training with the club before completing their transfers after Rangers agreed a compensation fee with Accrington, reported to be around £60,000 per player. Windass made his debut for Rangers in a pre-season friendly against American side Charleston Battery on 7 July 2016, scoring the opening goal in a 2–1 win. His official debut was against Motherwell in the Scottish League Cup on 16 July and Windass netted his first goal for the club against Lowland Football League side East Stirlingshire six days later. Windass spent periods of the first half of the 2016–17 season on the sidelines due to a recurring hamstring injury in early August and October. Despite this, Windass was linked with a return to England in December 2016, with EFL Championship sides Derby County and Newcastle United reportedly showing an interest in the midfielder.

During the 2017–18 Rangers F.C. season Windass finished the season with 18 goals in all competitions, tied (with Alfredo Morelos) as the club's top scorer for the season; with 13 of Windass' strikes in the league, the third-highest total behind Kris Boyd and Morelos.

Wigan Athletic
He signed for Wigan Athletic on 9 August 2018.

Sheffield Wednesday
Windass joined Sheffield Wednesday on loan for the remainder of the 2019–20 season on 31 January 2020. Due to Covid-19 his loan spell was extended until the end of July.

On 2 September 2020, he made his move to Sheffield Wednesday a permanent signing for an undisclosed fee. His first appearance on his return to the club was on 5 September 2020, in the EFL Cup away to Walsall, where he came on as a second half substitute. He would score his first goal as a permanent Wednesday player, on the opening day of the season in an away win against Cardiff City. He would win the clubs player of the month competition during his first month back at the club, after scoring 2 goals in 5 appearances.  Following relegation to League One, Windass was heavily linked with moves back to the Championship, with the club rejecting offers in the region of £1 million for him. 

During pre-season for the 2021–22 season, Windass suffered a hamstring injury during a friendly against West Bromwich Albion which would rule him out for two months and the start of the League One season. Despite being injured, he signed a new two-year deal at the club on 10 August 2021, which would see him remain at the club until the summer of 2023. Following his injury, he returned to the squad on 20 November as an unused substitute against Accrington Stanley and made his playing come back a few days later, coming off the bench to score an injury time winner against Milton Keynes Dons. Following the end of the 2021-22 season, there was again interest in him, with his ex Rangers manager Pedro Caixinha linking him with a surprise move to Atlético Talleres reported.

He scored two braces, against Cambridge United in League One and Newcastle United in the FA Cup, resulting in him winning the club's player of the month for January 2023 and a nomination from the EFL for player of the month.

Personal life
Windass was born in Hull, East Riding of Yorkshire, and is the son of former professional Dean Windass.

Career statistics

Playing style
Primarily an attacking midfielder, Windass can also play as a forward.

References

1994 births
Living people
Footballers from Kingston upon Hull
English footballers
Association football midfielders
Huddersfield Town A.F.C. players
Harrogate Railway Athletic F.C. players
Accrington Stanley F.C. players
Rangers F.C. players
Wigan Athletic F.C. players
Northern Football League players
English Football League players
Scottish Professional Football League players
Sheffield Wednesday F.C. players